Tuba City is an unincorporated town in Coconino County, Arizona, on the Navajo Nation, United States.  It is the second-largest community in Coconino County. The population of the census-designated place (CDP) was 8,611 at the 2010 census.

It is the most populous community within the Navajo Nation, slightly larger than Shiprock, New Mexico, and the site of the headquarters of the Western Navajo Agency. The Hopi village of Moenkopi lies directly to its southeast, and Hopi also live in the city.

European Americans named the town in honor of chief Tuuvi, a Hopi man from Oraibi who converted to the Church of Jesus Christ of Latter-day Saints and allowed Mormon migrants to settle in the area. The Navajo name for this community, translates as "tangled waters". It likely refers to the many below-ground springs that are the source of several reservoirs.

Tuba City is located within the Painted Desert near the western edge of the Navajo Nation. Most of Tuba City's residents are Navajo, with a small Hopi minority.

History

The Tuba City area was the territory of indigenous peoples for thousands of years. The community was first documented by Spanish explorers: Father Francisco Garcés visited the area in 1776, and recorded that the Hopi Indians were cultivating crops.

European-American migrants came as part of the Mormon movement to the West in the late 19th century. They named the town after Tuuvi, a Hopi man who converted to Mormonism circa 1870. He had invited the Mormons to settle near his village of Moenkopi without requiring them to gain individual permission. The Tuba City Trading Post was established in 1870, dealing with the Navajo and Paiute who came to the area for the natural springs, as well as the Hopi already in the area.
European-American Mormon emigrants claimed to found Tuba City in 1872.

In 1956, uranium began to be mined near Tuba City. The regional office for the Rare Metals Corporation was established here, which founded a mill for processing.  The Atomic Energy Commission had an office here as well. The mill closed in 1966. Reclamation of the millsite and tailings pile was completed in 1990 because the tailings had high radioactive content and were environmentally hazardous waste products that had to be cleared.

The Tuba City Regional Health Care Corporation hospital is located in Tuba City. It is a non-profit, Native American-run health care corporation that employs 1,200 people. The next nearest hospital is in Flagstaff.

Geography and climate

Geologically, Tuba City is sited about the Glen Canyon Group from the early Jurassic (about 180–210 Ma) and on modern superficial Quaternary deposits.

It is located within the Painted Desert near the western edge of the Navajo Nation. The town is served by U.S. Route 160, near the junction with Arizona State Route 264.

Arizona does not observe Daylight Saving Time, but the Navajo Nation does within its boundaries. In practice elements of Tuba City vary in practices: tribal offices and schools observe DST, while most private businesses conform to state practice and do not.

Tuba City is located in the rain shadow of the Mogollon Rim, which keeps out moisture from the Gulf of California. It has a cold desert climate (Köppen BWk) with hot, dry summersthough less hot than Phoenixand cold, dry winters. Frosts are normal from October to April. The majority of winters do not have measurable snowfall due to the dryness of the air descending from mountains to the south.

Demographics

As of the census of 2015, there were 9,722 people, 2,360 households, and 1,675 families residing in the CDP. The racial make-up of the CDP was 76.2% Native American, 8.4% White, 0.3% Black or African American, 0.8% Asian, <0.1% Pacific Islander, 0.6% from other races, and 1.5% from two or more races.  14.4% of the population were Hispanic or Latino of any race.

There were 2,360 households, out of which 52.9% had children under the age of 18 living with them, 49.0% were married couples living together, 26.0% had a female householder with no husband present, and 17.7% were non-families. 15.1% of all households were made up of individuals, and 2.3% had someone living alone who was 65 years of age or older.  The average household size was 4.00 and the average family size was 4.49.

In the CDP, the age distribution of the population shows 42.8% under the age of 18, 9.8% from 18 to 24, 27.5% from 25 to 44, 15.7% from 45 to 64, and 4.3% who were 65 years of age or older.  The median age was 23 years. For every 100 females, there were 93.8 males.  For every 100 females age 18 and over, there were 87.3 males.

Tuba City's median household income is $47,091, and the median income for a family was $37,813. Males had a median income of $29,280 versus $26,855 for females. The per capita income for the CDP was $14,140.  About 23.1% of families and 28.2% of the population were below the poverty line, including 33.0% of those under age 18 and 44.8% of those age 65 or over.

Attractions
The following attractions and infrastructure are located in Tuba City:
 The Explore Navajo Interactive Museum, opened in 2007, is located next to the historic Tuba City Trading Post.
 Hahonogeh Canyon, near Coal Mine Canyon, is noteworthy for blue colors most visible at sunrise and sunset.
 The Hopi have expanded tourist offerings: their Tuuvi Travel Center opened in 2008, a complex that cost $6.3 million. In 2010 they opened a motel, which cost $13 million. In 2011 a Denny's franchise restaurant opened across US Highway 160. The Hopi Nation plan a $100 million "Gateway to Hopiland" nearby.

Transportation 
The town is served by U.S. Route 160, near the junction with Arizona State Route 264.

It is served by the Tuba City Airport.

Navajo Transit System provides connections to Flagstaff and Fort Defiance. Hopi Senom Transit provides connections to Moenkopi. Express provides connecting service to Page.

Education 
The area is served by the Tuba City Unified School District, as well as several tribal/federal schools within the area.

Schools in Tuba City include:
 Tuba City High School
 Tuba City Jr. High School
 Eagles' Nest Intermediate School
 Tuba City Primary School
 Nizhoni Accelerated Academy

Bureau of Indian Education (BIE) schools include:
 Greyhills Academy High School (tribal)
 Tuba City Boarding School (Bureau-operated) established 1906

Moencopi Day School (tribal) is in nearby Moenkopi.

Tertiary institutions include:
 Diné College Tuba City Center
 Online classes from Northern Arizona University.

Sports
On January 4, 1988, Northern Arizona beat Central Connecticut 72–70 in Tuba City in the first Division I basketball game ever played on an Indian reservation.

Notable people

 Mary Morez, artist, was born near Tuba City
 Jonathan Nez, ninth and current President of the Navajo Nation
 Lori Piestewa, a soldier in the US Army, was killed in southern Iraq in 2003. In honor of her, Squaw Peak in Phoenix was renamed Piestewa Peak in 2008
 Sunshine Sykes, a federal judge on the Central District of California
 Aaron Yazzie, a mechanical engineer at NASA's Jet Propulsion Laboratory, was born in Tuba City

References

External links

 Arizonan.com profile
 Moenave Dinosaur Tracks, near Tuba City. From Atlas Obscura
 Tuba City Unified School District – local photos
 Local news

Census-designated places in Coconino County, Arizona
Populated places established in 1872
Populated places on the Navajo Nation
1872 establishments in Arizona Territory